The Federal University of Minas Gerais (UFMG) School of Medicine is one of the oldest and largest universities in Brazil. Founded in 1911, shortly after the creation of the capital city of Belo Horizonte, it produces 320 doctors every year – the biggest number of graduates per year in Brazil – and another 50 speech-language therapists.

History
On March 5, 1911, the Medical-Surgical Society of Minas Gerais created the School of Medicine in the city of Belo Horizonte, the fourth school of medicine to be founded in Brazil. It was housed in a stately house in the center of what is the capital of the state of Minas Gerais. In 1927, the institution integrated the University of Minas Gerais, which was made federal in 1949 with three other tertiary schools that existed in Belo Horizonte: the School of Law, the School of Engineering and the Free School of Dentistry, which included the course on Pharmacy.

The class of 1960 was the inaugural class the present building. The opening lecture was given by President Juscelino Kubitschek de Oliveira, alumnus, benefactor, and from then on, honorary professor. In the 1960s, the Medical Residency was made available for graduate students in various specialties. Graduate courses were implemented in 1968, with the creation of the PhD in Ophthalmology.

In the last few years, the School of Medicine also witnessed a considerable increase in faculty tenures and titles, leading to the expansion of numerous research projects and publications, always linked to theoretical and practical instruction to students.

The development of the School of Medicine has been constant. The first class to graduate in 1917 consisted of 17 students of medicine; in 1933 there were 70. In 1965, the number of ingresses was fixed at 160. In 1969, under pressure for a greater number of professionals in the market, the number doubled to 320, divided into two biannual ingresses. In 2007, the year of the graduation of the 123rd class, a total of 14,740 doctors graduated from this school.

On July 1, 1999, the undergraduate course on Speech-Language Pathology and Audiology was created. The first class entered the University in 2000. Starting in 2010, with the creation of courses on Gerontologic Care and on Radiology and Image Diagnostics Technology, the School graduates professionals able in the care for the elderly and image technicians, answering an increasing social demand in these areas.

The teaching reform in the School of Medicine in the 1970s revealed the necessity of a greater knowledge on the evolution of healthcare through the ages, and led to the creation of the Center for Memory of the School of Medicine – Cememor, open to visits by the public by appointment.

Undergraduate Course

Medicine
The main aim of the undergraduate course on Medicine in UFMG is the instruction of general physicians that are competent in the areas of Surgery, Gynecology and Obstetrics, Pediatrics, Internal Medicine, Public Health, and Mental Health. Knowledgeable about these skills and attitudes, the graduate will be a medical doctor able to give quality assistance, acting for the promotion of health, disease prevention, and in the recuperation and rehabilitation of the sick.

The course is divided in four cycles: Basic, from the first to the fourth semester; Propedeutic, composed by the fifth and sixth semesters; Out-patient Ambulatoria, from the seventh to the ninth; and Internships, composed by the last three semesters.

The courses on the Basic Cycle are offered in the Biological Sciences Institute, in the campus situated in Pampulha. From the fifth to the ninth semesters, the courses on clinics are developed with the direct contact between students and patients, in groups of ten students supervised by one faculty member. From the tenth onwards, the students take part in the urgency and emergency services, as well as in hospital inpatient care, always under faculty supervision.

The sites for the practical studies varies: laboratories for basic science; for clinical analysis;
and of education technology simulations; outpatient clinics in municipal health centers – in Belo Horizonte and in other towns in the state –, in the university hospitals Hospital das Clínicas (HC) and the Hospital Universitário Risoleta Tolentino Neves; in inpatient units and emergency services in the HC and in the numerous associated hospitals, such as the emergency
center Hospital de Pronto Socorro João XXIII.

The Rural Internship, which happens in the eleventh semester of the course, supplements the students’ practical instruction, and has the students acting for three months in municipal services in numerous small towns in the state’s countryside, in rural and urban areas. More than a compulsory course, the Rural Internship is considered by students and as an incomparable
professional and human experience.

Every semester, the School of Medicine receives 160 new students, selected by the UFMG unified entrance examinations, adding to a total of 1920 enrolled students. Faculty includes over 400 professors.

The undergraduate course of medicine in the UFMG has been considered the best
in the country by the press Editora Abril’s Guide for Students in 2006. It received
the maximum grade in the National Exam for the Performance of Students (ENADE)
and also in the external evaluation for teaching conditions promoted by the national
Ministry of Education.

Speech-Language Therapy and Audiology
The course offered at UFMG proposes a generalist and interdisciplinary formation
focused on the scientific and social aspects of Speech-Language Therapy and
Audiology. The undergraduate course has the minimum duration of four years and
can be concluded in up to 13 semesters. Presently, 50 openings are available each year,
divided in biannual ingresses.

The internships start on the fifth semester and include the areas of Speech, Child and
Adult Languages, Oral Motion, Child and Adult Audiology, Voice and Public Health.
The Speech-Language Therapy and Audiology Outpatient Clinic, where the internships
take place in the Hospital das Clínicas facilities, is composed of 11 rooms planned
for patient care, which is give free of charge for the population. Six of these rooms
have observation panels, where students can observe and learn from their colleagues.

Faculty includes 42 professors, 19 from the School of Medicine, and 11 speech-language
therapists themselves. Apart from the School of Medicine and the Outpatient Clinic,
another nine academic units from the University offer Speech-Language Therapy and
Audiology courses: the Biological Sciences Institute, the School of Philosophy and
Human Sciences, the School of Languages and Arts, the School of Music, the School
of Physical Education, Physiotherapy and Occupational Therapy, the Exact Sciences
Institute, the School of Dentistry, the School for Information Sciences, and the Nursing
School.

Graduate Courses
The UFMG School of Medicine offers many Graduate Courses stricto sensu and lato sensu
with active production and steady expansion, besides Medical Residency in the Hospital das
Clínicas.

Stricto sensu
Ever since the creation of the first graduate course in 1968, over a thousand MA theses and
about 400 PhD dissertations have been approved at the UFMG School of Medicine. Presently,
there are about 420 students enrolled. Graduate courses stricto sensu in the School of Medicine
include the following programs, all offered at MA and PhD levels:

Ophthalmology and Surgery Applied Sciences
Adult Care Applied Sciences
Health Sciences – Child and Adolescent Care
Health Sciences – Infectology and Tropical Medicine
Pathology
Women Care
Public Health

Lato sensu
Graduate courses lato sensu include five specializations in the area of Pediatrics;
Gastroenterology, Pneumology, Endocrinology, Cardiology, and Adolescent Care.
The Department of Preventive and Social Medicine offers many courses
on the areas of Public Health, focusing on Health Services Management
and Workers’ Health, among others, some of them offered by the Center
for the Education in Public Health (Nescon), that also offers specialization courses in the areas
of Basic Care and Family Health, and Epidemiology.

Medical Residency
The Medical Residency is a graduate course on the same level as the specialization,
developed as a supervised program of in-service instruction, which aims at the
development of qualified professionals in specific areas of medicine.

At UFMG it is developed in the Hospital das Clínicas (HC) and in the Hospital
Universitário Risoleta Tolentino Neves. The Medical Residency in Family Health is
offered in the towns of Belo Horizonte, Tiradentes e Brumadinho. Agreements for
extension of the program to other towns are underway.

The Hospital das Clínicas offers 41 programs of Medical Residency, all accredited by the
national Ministry of Education. The programs have the minimal duration of two years
and maximum of five, depending on the specialty. Another seven Residency programs
are available at Hospital Universitário Risoleta Tolentino Neves.

Students are selected by means of an examination promoted by the Medical Residency
Coordination (Coreme). Applications can be submitted in October every year, and the
exams take place in November and December, on two phases consisted of objective
questions on general knowledge of Medicine and the analysis of the students’
curricula.

Extension Programs
The extension programs developed at the UFMG School of Medicine seek to establish
educational, cultural, and scientific interactions between University and society. This relation
allows the students to elaborate on the praxis of academic knowledge, by means of an
interdisciplinary work based on the contact with the Brazilian national and regional realities.

The community, on the other hand, effectively takes part on this process, and can intervene
in University actions.

Created in 1976, the UFMG School of Medicine Extension Center offers courses, seminars,
conference cycles and other activities for the academic community, for healthcare professionals
and for the community at large.

Research and Scientific Production
The research activity in the UFMG School of Medicine goes as far back as the creation of
the school, and has become traditional in many areas. In the last few years, the number
of lines of research and research groups has increased significantly. An expanding
number of undergraduate students are also taking part in research developed as
scientific initiation programs.

The School has dozens of laboratories and has important national and international
funding partners, including Fapemig, Finep, Capes, CNPq, and the European Union,
besides UFMG’s own Office for Research Affairs.

Among the areas that concentrate lines of research developed at the UFMG School
of Medicine, we can find Infectious and Parasite Diseases; Medical and Compared
Pathology; Epidemiology, Health Service Management and Worker’s Health, Internal
Medicine, Gynecology, Fetal Medicine and Obstetrics; Experimental Surgery, Surgery
of the Digestive System, and Neurosurgery; Ophthalmology; Neurosciences; Child and
Adolescent Health; and Microbiology of the Digestive System.

Faculty and departments
The UFMG School of Medicine is composed of eleven departments and has 411 faculty members. The faculty has 243 (59%) PhD-level professors, 85 (21%) on MA level, and 83 (20%) specialists. In 2006, 51 (12.4%) of these specialists were pursuing better qualifications.

The UFMG School of Medicine faculty take part on intense and complex university activities in teaching, research, extension, and administration. The majority (232 or 56% in 2006) are on an exclusive work regimen for the university and are not to be employed elsewhere. A significant number of professors are employed in the partial regimen, and thus keep their activities in the health systems.

In the past years, there was an intense expansion in the number of books, chapters and
articles published in scientific journals, rising from 0.5 per faculty member in 1990 to 1.9 in 2006. The number of projects trebled in the last 16 years, reaching a total of 973 in 2006.

The participation of faculty in events totaled 1,899, and the number of advisees (both in the undergraduate and graduate levels, including medical residency) was 1,692 in 2006, thus reflecting the intense activity of faculty in the areas of teaching, research, and extension.

Life on Campus

With over 15 thousand people on circulation every day, the UFMG Health campus is always
on the move. Besides classes and the research and assistance work, a number of activities
involve not only students, faculty and employees, but are also open to the community.

Cultural Activities
The academic community at the School of Medicine has always taken part on a variety
of cultural initiatives. Among them were writers such as Guimarães Rosa and Pedro Nava.
Presently, the Health & Culture program, a partnership with the Nursing School and the
Hospital das Clínicas, promotes theatrical, musical, and dance events, as well as movies and
exhibitions.

Students’ Organizations
In the School of Medicine we can find active the Diretório Acadêmico Alfredo Balena (DAAB), which represents the medical students, and the DAFono, the entity for the students of Speech-Language Therapy and Audiology.

Alfredo Balena Academic Directory (DAAB)
The origin of the Alfredo Balena Academic Directory (DAAB), formerly called the Academic Center of the Faculty of Medicine (CAFM), is mixed with the origin of the Faculty of Medicine itself. Apparently, the CAFM was founded in October 1913. In 1920, CAFM launched his first periodical - “Radium” - which was dedicated not only to academic publications in the various areas of medicine, but also to news about the new capital of Minas Gerais, Belo Horizonte, which was still flourishing.

After the death of Professor Alfredo Balena, the then CAFM was renamed DAAB and, a year later, in 1960, as part of the commemorations of the 50th anniversary of the Faculty of Medicine, the new headquarters was inaugurated, with 450m2. At the same time, the DAAB created the Freshman Reception and already represented a pleasant refuge for academics.

Currently, Directory's headquarters is one of the only living spaces within the "Health Campus", being an important meeting point for students and employees. Management makes an effort to keep the space cozy, making sure that the puffs, the foosball, pool and ping-pong tables, the guitar, the hammocks, the microwave, among many other things that we offer to the students, are available.

On the pages of Jornal PH7, a serial created by the students in 1946, many have already written about characters and facts that maded UFMG. The publication was a focus of resistance during the Military Dictatorship and contributed to important changes in medical curricula. Currently, PH7 is no longer published. Despite that, the DAAB continues to work to improve teaching at FM-UFMG and to make the student's voice heard within Collegiate meetings and Departmental Chambers.

The history of the DAAB is long, but it has always meant resistance and defense of democracy. It was at DAAB that the 3rd National Student Meeting took place in 1977, a milestone in the union of students in the fight against the Dictatorship. The motto “For Education as the Practice of Freedom” is quite representative of what the management of this Directory proposes to build together with the academic community each year.

Conclave Médico Desportivo (CMD)
The Medical Sports Union, called Conclave Médico Desportivo (CMD), was created in 1996 to promote the integration of medical students in sports activities, before that the student sports issues was part of a DAAB coordination. The Conclave Médico Desportivo organizes the UFMG School of Medicine participation in the Minas Gerais Intermed, which gathers students from all medical courses statewide in sports matches. The UFMG was the winner for the 14th consecutive year in 2009. And in 2022 won it's 23rd title.

Center for Psycho-pedagogic Support for Students at the School of Medicine - Napem
Created in 2004, the Center for Psycho-pedagogic Support for Students at the School of Medicine
(Napem) welcomes medical students that have some kind of emotional problem interfering
with their academic life. The Center is a team of qualified professionals who
are available every day upon appointment. The Napem also takes part on cultural activities,
debates and research on emotional issues that effect the students’ as well as the professionals’
lives. Once a month, a free movie session is open to the public. The screening is followed
by commentaries and a debate. Napem is organized in a partnership with the students’
organization Diretório Acadêmico Alfredo Balena (DAAB).

Show Medicine
A theatrical comedy, characterized by social criticism and irony, on various themes that
include, of course, the medical practice. The Show Medicine is annually organized by
the Theatrical Group of Adroit Academics (Grutaa), which includes around 80 amateur
artists, all students of the UFMG School of Medicine. They are responsible for the
text, costumes, make-up, lighting, and all that is part of the theatrical pieces. Show
Medicine was created in 1954 and its activities were only interrupted during the years
of the Brazilian Military Dictatorship because of censorship. The Show Medicine has
become a tradition, with a record audience in the space Teatro Sesiminas for eleven
consecutive years.

Alumni Association
Idealized by Professor Baeta Viana, the Association was founded in 1953 in order to
maintain a permanent link between alumni and the School of Medicine. In 1985 the
Alumni Room was created and became a dedicated space in the School of Medicine
building where monthly meetings are held. Additionally, every year solemn ceremonies
take place so as to celebrate 25 and 50 years of graduation, where alumni receive a
commemorative diploma.

Program Friends of the Medicine School

Structure
The School of Medicine is located in the UFMG Health campus, on an area of
104,000 m2 in the hospital district in central Belo Horizonte. The School building alone
occupies a total of 24,000 m2. Located in it and in the other buildings are dozens of
laboratories dedicated to teaching and research and to the extension services, as well as
support services such as the library, food hall, bookshop, pharmacy, and banks.

University Hospitals
The Federal University of Minas Gerais keeps two hospitals for the practical instruction
of students in the health areas: the Hospital das Clínicas, situated in the Health campus,
in the central area of Belo Horizonte, and the Hospital Universitário Risoleta Tolentino
Neves, in the northern district Venda Nova. The two hospitals have complementary
roles, divided between specialized assistance and emergency services.

The Hospital das Clínicas Compound
Opened in 1928, the Hospital das Clínicas (HC) is a compound which includes the
main building – Hospital São Vicente de Paulo – and seven annex buildings designed
for outpatient services: Ambulatório Bias Fortes, Anexo Oswaldo Costa, Ambulatório
São Vicente, Hospital Borges da Costa, Hospital São Geraldo, the Orestes Diniz
Center for Training and Reference in Infectious and Parasite Diseases, and the new
Jenny Faria Center for the Care of Elderly and Women, as well as the Interns’ Hall of
Residence Anexo Maria Guimarães.

A special unit inside UFMG, the university public hospital houses activities in
teaching, research and assistance. It is a reference for the municipal and state health
systems in the care of patients with infirmities of medium and high complexity. It
monthly provides 25,000 walk-in consultations, with a mean of 1,600 inpatients,
2,000 surgical procedures and 280 births of medium and high complexity.

Hospital Universitário Risoleta Tolentino Neves
The Hospital Universitário Risoleta Tolentino Neves (HRTN) is managed by the UFMG
since June 2006. It is situated in Venda Nova, a northern district of Belo Horizonte, and in the opposite direction of the city’s hospital district. With a mean of 12,000 monthly
consultations, it pays significant contribution to the regionalization of healthcare in Belo
Horizonte.

Compared to the Hospital das Clínicas, which focuses on medical specialties, the main goal
of this new University Hospital is the assistance to trauma and non-trauma emergencies.
This unit stands out for the services in Orthopedics, General Surgery, and Internal Medicine,
as well as in the areas of Pediatrics, Plastic Surgery, Vascular Surgery, Neurology, Anesthesia,
and in the Maternity.

The Hospital has a built area of 22,000 m2. It operates with 272 beds and six surgical rooms,
where 400 surgical procedures take place very month. The HRTN has over 150 students from
the medicine and Speech-Language Therapy and Audiology courses, as well as ten interns
from Medical Residency.

J. Baeta Vianna Library
Located on a building with a total area of 3152 m², distributed onto four floors, the
Peripheral Library in the Health campus receives over 100,000 monthly consults. Linked
to the UFMG Library System, constituted of 28 units, it is a modern center for information
services, with internet access and book check-out, in a total of over 53,000 volumes.

The Library also offers research facilities, normalization and interlibrary loans, as well as
training for users, with courses on bibliographical research and on the writing of research
papers. The website gives access to over 90 databases with abstracts and articles in various
fields, and also to the Capes Portal electronic periodicals, which makes available full-text
electronic copies of articles published in approximately 11,000 national and international
journals.

Part of the Brazilian Network on Health Sciences Information and the Latin-American and
Caribbean Center on Health Sciences Information (BIREME), the Library is responsible for
collecting, keeping, and processing the scientific documentation produced in the state of
Minas Gerais, and to feed into the database of the Latin-American Health Sciences-Public
Health Literature (LILACS-SP)

Technology
Incorporating technology to teaching, research, extension and administration is an
important concern for the UFMG School of Medicine. The Health Technology Center
(Cetes) coordinates all activities in this area.

One of its initiatives is the Simulation Laboratory, where, every semester, over
500 students use computers, mannequins, anatomic models, and equipment for
the reproduction of procedures such as gynecology exams, cardio-pulmonary
resuscitation practices, tracheal intubation, and the administering of medication.

Among the advantages of simulation are the possibility of a more ethic and
safe learning, with no risk to the patient, and also the unhindered repetition of
procedures to help clarify students’ doubts. The idea is to add tools to the traditional
methods of teaching, never losing sight of the irreplaceable gains of interpersonal
contact, impossible to simulate.

In the Center for Tele-health (Nutel), information and communication technologies
are used as tools for the qualification of health professionals and for the discussion
of clinical cases in videoconferences and long distance consultations. It produces
courses and teaching materials for distance learning, with resources such as 3D
models and video. This pioneering experience, initiated in 2003 in a partnership
with the Belo Horizonte Municipal Authorities, contributes to the implementation
of the National Tele-health Program, administered by the Ministry of Health, also
in partnership with the State of Minas Gerais Health Authority. Nutel also has many
international partners, including the European Union.

References

External links
University homepage
www.medicina.ufmg.br

See also
Brazil University Rankings
Universities and Higher Education in Brazil

Educational institutions established in 1911
Universidade Federal de Minas Gerais
1911 establishments in Brazil